Sir Robert Basil Reid  (7 February 1921 – 17 December 1993) was chairman of the British Railways Board from 1983 until 1990.

The son of Sir Robert Niel Reid, Governor of Assam from 1937 to 1942, he was educated at Malvern and Brasenose. During World War II he was an Officer in the Royal Tank Regiment.  When peace returned he joined the LNER as a Traffic Apprentice. When the "Big Four" merged he rose steadily within British Railways. By 1961 he was a District Passenger manager and by 1967 Planning Manager of the Scottish Region. He was General Manager of the Southern Region from  1974 to 1976; and the Executive Member for Marketing from 1977 to 1980. He became Chief Executive in 1980, and held that post until his appointment as Chairman. He was a Freeman of the City of London and Master of the Information Technologists' Company from 1988 to 1989.

Notes

1921 births
1993 deaths
British Rail people
Alumni of Brasenose College, Oxford
People educated at Malvern College
English knights
Knights Bachelor
Commanders of the Order of the British Empire
Royal Tank Regiment officers
Masters of the Worshipful Company of Information Technologists
British Army personnel of World War II